Kassiano Soares Mendonca (born 24 April 1995) is a Brazilian footballer who plays as a midfielder for Cape Town Spurs.

Career
Before the 2014 season, Soares was sent on loan to Finnish side MYPA from Fluminense in Brazil, where he made 10 appearances and scored 0 goals and suffered a thigh injury. On 12 February 2014, he debuted for MYPA during a 3-0 win over KuPs. After that, Soares was sent on loan to Slovak third division club FC ŠTK 1914 Šamorín.

In 2018, he signed for Qormi in the Maltese top flight, where he claimed the football was "very tactical".

Before the 2020 season, Soares signed for Thai second division team Ranong United.

Before the second half of 2020/21, he signed for Cape Town Spurs in the South African second division.

Career statistics

References

External links
 
 Kassiano Soares at playmakerstats.com

Brazilian footballers
Expatriate footballers in Slovakia
Expatriate footballers in Thailand
Kassiano Soares
National First Division players
Sportspeople from Rio de Janeiro (state)
Expatriate footballers in Finland
Living people
Expatriate soccer players in South Africa
Association football midfielders
1995 births
Qormi F.C. players
Maltese Premier League players
Veikkausliiga players
Sport Club Internacional players
FC ŠTK 1914 Šamorín players
Myllykosken Pallo −47 players